"Buzz-Buzz-Buzz" is a song written by John Gray and Bobby Day and performed by The Hollywood Flames.  The lead vocals were by Earl Nelson, and later by Bob & Earl.  It reached number 5 on the US R&B chart and number 11 on the Billboard pop chart in 1957.

The single ranked 94th on Billboard's Year-End Hot 100 singles of 1958.

Other versions
Rusty Draper released a version of the song as the B-side to his 1957 single, "I Get the Blues When It Rains".
Frankie Lymon released a version of the song as the B-side to his 1960 single, "Waitin' in School".
Day later released a version of the song as the B-side to his 1963 single, "Pretty Little Girl Next Door".
Rocky Roberts and the Airedales released a version of the song as a single in 1967.
Shakin' Stevens and the Sunsets released a version of the song on his 1973 album, Shakin' Stevens & Sunsets.
Jonathan Richman & the Modern Lovers released a version of the song as a single in 1978 in the United Kingdom.
The Blasters released a version of the song on their 1980 album, American Music.
Huey Lewis and the News released a version of the song on their 1982 album, Picture This.
The Beach Boys performed the song live during 1984.
Los Lobos with Lalo Guerrero released a version of the song on their 1995 album, Papa's Dream.
Collage released a version of the song on their 1999 album, Chapter II 1999.
The Refreshments released a version of the song on their 2008 album, Jukebox - Refreshing Classics.

References

1957 songs
1957 singles
1967 singles
1978 singles
Songs written by Bobby Day
The Hollywood Flames songs
Brunswick Records singles
Beserkley Records singles